Jacopo Contarini (1194-1280) was the 47th Doge of Venice, from 6 September 1275 to his abdication on 6 March 1280.

Although he came from one of the most illustrious Venetian families, Contarini, Jacopo was not considered an influential person and he was probably chosen as a compromise between the two major factions. Being already in his eighties and unable to face the position's challenges - a revolt in Istria and Crete and a war with Ancona - he abdicated as Doge after five years and retired to a monastery, where he died the same year. He was probably buried in the church of Frari. He was married to one Jacobina.

References

Jacopo
13th-century Doges of Venice
1194 births
1280 deaths